Fabio Traversa (born  17 November 1952) is an Italian  actor.

Life and career 
Born in Naples, a real life friend of Nanni Moretti, Traversa appeared in Moretti's debut medium length film Pâté de bourgeois (1973) and made his feature film debut in 1976, in Moretti's I Am Self Sufficient. 

After the leading roles in two comedy-drama films by Vittorio Sindoni, Gli anni struggenti (1979) and Quasi quasi mi sposo (1982), in the early 1980s Traversa specialized as a character actor, being mainly cast in humorous roles.

Selected filmography 
 I Am Self Sufficient (1976)
 Ecce bombo (1978)
 Il minestrone (1981)
 The Lady of the Camellias (1981)
 Sciopèn (1982)
 Compagni di scuola (1988)
 Red Wood Pigeon (1989)
 Le comiche (1990)
 Fantozzi - Il ritorno (1996)
 Fantozzi 2000 – La clonazione (1999)
 It Can’t Be All Our Fault (2003)

References

External links  
 

 

1952 births 
Living people 
20th-century Italian male actors 
Italian male film actors
Italian male stage actors
Italian male television actors 
Male actors from Naples